Gymnogongrus griffithsiae is a small uncommon seaweed.

Description
This small alga grows to 5 cm long from a small disc. The fronds are erect, stiff and branch dichotomously in 1 plane, the tips a little flattened. In colour it is dark purplish brown. The structure is multiaxial with elongated cells surrounded cortical cells.

Reproduction
Male spermatangia are unknown. Carpotetasporangial outgrowths, that is sporangia containing four spores, by a carposporophyte outgrowth which develops during the year.

Distribution
Found in Great Britain and Ireland with a southern range, as far north as Lough Swilly. In the north Atlantic in the Azores in Europe to Massachusetts to Virginia in North America.

Habitat
The plants grow in rock pools of the lower littoral and in the upper sublittoral.

Possible confusion
This species is similar to Ahnfeltia plicata which usually has wiry irregular branching.

Further reading
Guiry, M.D., Irvine, L.M., Morton, O. 1981. Notes on Irish marine algae- 4 Gymnogongrus devoniensis (Greville) Schotter (Rhodophyta. Irish Naturalists Journal 20: 288 - 292.

References

Phyllophoraceae
Seaweeds